The 29th Buil Film Awards ceremony was hosted by the Busan-based daily newspaper Busan Ilbo. It was held on October 22, 2020 at the Busan Exhibition and Convention Center in Busan. It did not invite an audience to prevent the spread of COVID-19.

Awards and nominations 
Complete list of nominees and winners:

(Winners denoted in bold)

References

External links 

  
 29th Buil Film Awards at Daum 

Buil Film Awards
2020 film awards
October 2020 events in South Korea